NA-200 Sukkur-I is a constituency for the National Assembly of Pakistan.

Election 2002 

General elections were held on 10 Oct 2002. Syed Khurshid Ahmed Shah of PPP won by 35291 votes.

Election 2008 

General elections were held on 18 Feb 2008. Nauman Islam Shaikh of PPP won by 74,086 votes.

Election 2013 

General elections were held on 11 May 2013. Nauman Islam Shaikh of PPP won by 52,684 votes and became the  member of National Assembly.

Election 2018 

General elections are scheduled to be held on 25 July 2018.

See also
NA-199 Ghotki-II
NA-201 Sukkur-II

References

External links 
Election result's official website

NA-198